Virrat is an impact crater on Mars, approximately  in diameter. It is located at 31.1°S, 103°W, southwest of the crater Dinorwic and northeast of Clantas Fossae. Several Virrat crater radii to the north are the craters Koga and Nhill. It is named after Virrat, a town in Finland. According to a surface age map of Mars based on US Geological Survey data, the area around Virrat is from the Noachian epoch, which places the area's age at 3.8 to 3.5 billion years ago.

References

Impact craters on Mars
Thaumasia quadrangle